Sunčane Skale 2012 was the eighteenth edition of Sunčane Skale, an annual pop festival held in Montenegro.

Results

Nove zvijezde

Pjesma ljeta

The winner of Nove zvijezde should perform first in the final, but actually did not perform.

Scoreboard

Sunčane Skale
2012 in Montenegro